Neville Wyatt Black (25 April 1925 – 24 January 2016) was a New Zealand rugby union and rugby league player who represented New Zealand in rugby union.

Rugby union career
A rugby union first five-eighth, Black played for Ponsonby RFC. He represented Auckland at a provincial level, and was a member of the New Zealand national side, the All Blacks, on their 1949 tour of South Africa. He played 10 matches for the All Blacks on that tour, three of them at halfback, including one international.

Rugby league career
In 1951 he switched codes, signing for Wigan. He made his début on 22 December 1951. He later also played three matches for the Other Nationalities side in the European Rugby League Championship.

In 1953 he, along with four other Wigan players, signed with Keighley.

He returned to New Zealand in 1957 and played for the Ngongotaha club.

Later years
Black died in Rotorua on 24 January 2016.

References

1925 births
2016 deaths
People from Kawakawa, New Zealand
People educated at Rotorua Boys' High School
New Zealand rugby union players
New Zealand international rugby union players
Auckland rugby union players
Rugby union fly-halves
Rugby union scrum-halves
New Zealand rugby league players
Wigan Warriors players
Rugby league five-eighths
New Zealand expatriate sportspeople in England
Expatriate rugby league players in England
New Zealand expatriate rugby league players
Ngongotaha Chiefs players
Keighley Cougars players